Hoàng Thị Duyên (born 26 April 1996) is a Vietnamese weightlifter.

She won the silver medal in the Snatch in the women's 59 kg event at the 2018 World Weightlifting Championships held in Ashgabat, Turkmenistan.

In 2020, she won the gold medal in the women's 59kg event at the Roma 2020 World Cup in Rome, Italy. In 2021, she won the bronze medal in her event at the 2020 Asian Weightlifting Championships held in Tashkent, Uzbekistan. She also represented Vietnam at the 2020 Summer Olympics in Tokyo, Japan. She finished in 5th place in the women's 59 kg event.

Major results

References

External links 
 

Living people
1996 births
Place of birth missing (living people)
Vietnamese female weightlifters
Weightlifters at the 2020 Summer Olympics
Olympic weightlifters of Vietnam
21st-century Vietnamese women